The 2001 Cronulla-Sutherland Sharks season was the 35th in the club's history. They competed in the NRL's 2001 Telstra Premiership.

Season summary
The Sharks had a fantastic 2001 season which saw them finish in the top four for the third time in five seasons (including the only Super League season). It was in their first qualifying finals match against the defending premiers Brisbane (the third year in succession the Sharks had met the Broncos at this stage) that the new Telstra Premiership logo, to be used until the end of 2006, was first seen on the field. The Sharks won this match comfortably, followed by a 54-10 thrashing of second-placed Canterbury, which set them up for a second attempt at a Grand Final berth in three years. Despite leading at half-time, the Sharks were run down in the second half by the Andrew Johns-led Newcastle Knights, who ultimately went on to win the premiership. Yet another Sharks season of promise ended in disappointment.

The highlight of the season was Preston Campbell, who later went on to play in Penrith's 2003 premiership, winning the coveted Dally M Medal.

Ladder

References

Cronulla-Sutherland Sharks seasons
Cronulla-Sutherland Sharks season